Richard Lowe Teitelbaum (May 19, 1939 – April 9, 2020) was an American composer, keyboardist, and improvisor. A student of Allen Forte, Mel Powell, and Luigi Nono, he was known for his live electronic music and synthesizer performances. He was a pioneer of brain-wave music.  He was also involved with world music and used Japanese, Indian, and western classical instruments and notation in both composition and improvisational settings.

Biography
Born in New York City, Teitelbaum remembered listening to his father (a successful lawyer) play piano while he was a child.  A 1960 graduate of Haverford College, Teitelbaum continued keyboard studies at Mannes School of Music, then pursued his Masters in Music at Yale.  He won a Fulbright grant to study in Italy in 1964 with Goffredo Petrassi, then in 1965 with Luigi Nono. While at Haverford, Teitelbaum met the composer Henry Cowell, and, following Cowell's death, became an executor of the Cowell estate.

While in Italy, he became a founding member of Musica Elettronica Viva with Alvin Curran and Frederic Rzewski.  In the mid-1960s he began researching the use of brain-waves to control musical events and, as a result, he brought the first Moog synthesizer to Europe in 1967.  His piece In Tune was first performed with Barbara Mayfield in late 1967.

In 1970, he returned to the US to study Ethnomusicology at Wesleyan University; while there he founded the World Band (one of the first inter-cultural improvisatory ensembles) with the master musicians teaching in that program.

In 1976 and 1977, another Fulbright fellowship allowed Teitelbaum to travel to Japan, where he studied gagaku (learning hichiriki from Masataro Togi, the chief court musician of Japan's Imperial Household music department), as well as shakuhachi with Katsuya Yokoyama.

Teitelbaum provided the score for the 1979 animated short film Asparagus, written and directed by Suzan Pitt.

Teitelbaum also collaborated with Anthony Braxton, Nam June Paik, Joan Jonas, Andrew Cyrille, Leroy Jenkins, Steve Lacy, Alvin Lucier, and David Behrman, among many others.

Teitelbaum lived in upstate New York and taught at Bard College beginning in 1988, also serving as the director of that college's Electronic Music Studio. He died of a stroke on April 9, 2020, and is survived by his wife, the classical pianist Hiroko Sakurazawa. He was 80 years old.

Awards
Teitelbaum was awarded a Guggenheim, the two Fulbrights mentioned above, and grants from the National Endowment for the Arts, the New York State Council on the Arts, the New York Foundation for the Arts, the Venice Biennale, The Rockefeller Foundation, and the Asian Cultural Council.

Discography
Time Zones (Freedom, 1976) with Anthony Braxton
Hiuchi-Ishi (Denon Jazz, 1978)
Blends & The Digital Pianos (Lumina, 1984)
Concerto Grosso (hat ART, 1985 [1988])
The Sea Between (Victo, 1988) with Carlos Zíngaro
Cyberband (Moers Music, 1993)
Golem (Tzadik, 1994)
Duet: Live At Merkin Hall, NYC (Music & Arts, 1994) with Anthony Braxton
Double Clutch (Silkheart, 1997) with Andrew Cyrille
Shift (For 4 Ears, 1997) with Hans Burgener and Martin Schütz
>11>Ways>to>Proceed (For 4 Ears, 1999) with Hans Burgener, Günter Müller and Carlos Zíngaro as BTMZ
Blends (New Albion, 2002) with Katsuya Yokoyama

With Anthony Braxton
Trio and Duet (Sackville, 1974)
 New York, Fall 1974  (Arista.1975)
Creative Orchestra Music 1976 (Arista, 1976)
Open Aspects '82 (Hat Hut Records, 1995)
With Company
Once (Incus, 1989)
With Marilyn Crispell
Dream Libretto (Leo, 2018)
With Andrew Cyrille
The Declaration of Musical Independence (ECM, 2014 [2016])
With Leroy Jenkins
Space Minds, New Worlds, Survival of America (Tomato, 1978)
With Steve Lacy
Sideways (Roaratorio, 1968 [2000])
With Joëlle Léandre
Joëlle Léandre Project (Leo, 1999)
With George E. Lewis
Homage to Charles Parker (Black Saint, 1979)
 Chicago Slow Dance (Lovely Music, 1981)
With Musica Elettronica Viva Friday (Polydor, 1969)The Sound Pool (BYG Actuel, 1969)Live Electronic Music Improvised (Mainstream, 1970) - split album with AMMUnited Patchwork'' (Horo, 1978)

Sources

External links
 Richard Teitelbaum's official web site
 Bard.edu: Teitelbaum
  at 23:45 'Solo for Three Pianos', Richard Teitelbaum at the Claxon Sound Festival for improvised music in The Netherlands (1984)
 

1939 births
2020 deaths
20th-century classical composers
21st-century classical composers
American male classical composers
American classical composers
Avant-garde jazz musicians
Bard College faculty
Moers Music artists
21st-century American composers
20th-century American composers
20th-century American male musicians
21st-century American male musicians
Male jazz musicians